5V or 5-V may refer to:

5V, IATA code for Everts Air
5V, former IATA code for Lviv Airlines
5V, abbreviation for 5 volts, sometimes incorrectly written as 5v
5V, abbreviation for 5-valve engine
ZIS-5V, a model of ZIS-5 (truck)
5V, a model of Toyota V engine
5V, a model series for Intel 80386
5V chess; see Minishogi
5V, the production code for the 1981 Doctor Who serial Logopolis

See also
V5 (disambiguation)